The Skinny may refer to:
 The Skinny (magazine), a Scottish magazine
 The Skinny (film), 2012 film
 The Skinny (TV series), a 2016 American television series
 "The Skinny", a segment on World News Now

See also 
 Skinny (disambiguation)
 Skinny dip (disambiguation)